Indian Institute of Tourism and Travel Management (IITTM) is an institute based in Gwalior, Madhya Pradesh, India, with campuses in Bhubaneswar, Noida,  Nellore, and Goa, offering training, education and research in sustainable management of tourism, travel and other allied sectors. It is an autonomous organization under the Ministry of Tourism, Government of India. It was established in 1983.

Campus

Academics 
Academic programmes offered by IITTM are based on the standard model of management education practised globally. IITTM offers specially tailored tourism business management programmes besides offering a variety of training programmes for different stake holders.
Programmes offered by IITTM are:
Gwalior Center-

 PhD in Tourism 
Masters in Business Administration (Tourism and Travel)
Bachelors In Business Administration (Tourism and Travel)

Bhubaneswar Center-

Masters in Business Administration (Tourism and Travel)
Bachelors in Business Administration (Tourism and Travel)

Noida Center-

Masters in Business Administration (Tourism and Travel)
Bachelors in Business Administration (Tourism and Travel)

Nellore Center-

Masters in Business Administration (Tourism and Travel)
Bachelors in Business Administration(Tourism and Travel)

See also
Institute of Hotel Management
Confederation of Tourism and Hospitality
List of autonomous higher education institutes in India

References
      
6. http://tourism.gov.in/writereaddata/CMSPagePicture/file/marketresearch/New/PPA.pdf

7. http://www.niws.nic.in/report2.pdf

External links 

Organizations established in 1983
1983 establishments in India
Hospitality schools in India
Hospitality management
Ministry of Tourism (India)
Universities and colleges in Gwalior